Rhyzodiastes maritimus is a species of ground beetle in the subfamily Rhysodinae. It was described by R.T. & J.R. Bell in 1981. It is endemic to the island of Kosrae in the east of the Federated States of Micronesia. Rhyzodiastes maritimus measure  in length.

References

Rhyzodiastes
Beetles of Oceania
Endemic fauna of the Federated States of Micronesia
Beetles described in 1981